The 27th Annual SunBank 24 at Daytona was a 24-hour endurance sports car race held on February 4–5, 1989 at the Daytona International Speedway road course. The race served as the opening round of the 1989 IMSA GT Championship.

Victory overall and in the GTP class went to the No. 67 Miller High Life/BF Goodrich 962 Porsche 962 driven by Bob Wollek, Richard Farb, and John Andretti. Victory in the Lights class went to the No. 9 Essex Racing Tiga GT288 driven by Charles Morgan, John Morrison, and Tom Hessert Jr. The GTO class was won by the No. 16 Stroh's Light Cougar Mercury Cougar XR-7 driven by Pete Halsmer, Bob Earl, Mark Martin, and Paul Stewart. Finally, the GTU class was won by the No. 17 Al Bacon Performance Mazda RX-7 driven by Al Bacon, Bob Reed, and Rod Millen.

Race results
Class winners in bold.

References

24 Hours of Daytona
1989 in sports in Florida
1989 in American motorsport